The Quirke series of crime novels, written by Irish novelist John Banville under the pen name Benjamin Black, centers on the titular character, a pathologist in 1950s Dublin. The series is published by Henry Holt & Co. in the U.S.. The first novel, Christine Falls, was first released by Picador in the U.K. in 2006; it was published in the U.S. a year later.

Banville has stated that he drew from his experiences when he first moved to Dublin to inform the Quirke series:

The final novel in the series April in Spain features the character St. John Strafford, who is also a character in other Banville works.

Television adaptation

A three-part miniseries based on the novels stars Gabriel Byrne as Quirke. The series first aired on RTÉ One in Ireland in early 2014, and later that year on BBC One in the UK.

Books
 Christine Falls (2007)
 The Silver Swan (2008)
 Elegy for April (2010)
 A Death in Summer (2011)
 Vengeance (2012)
 Holy Orders (2013)
 Even the Dead (2016)
 April in Spain (2021)

References

External links
Website for Benjamin Black

2006 Irish novels
Novels by John Banville
Irish crime novels